The Dresdner Eislöwen are a professional ice hockey team based in Dresden, Saxony, Germany. They currently play in DEL2, the second level of ice hockey in Germany. Prior to the 2013–14 season they played in the 2nd Bundesliga. They play their home games at the EnergieVerbund Arena (formerly known as Freiberger Arena) which hosts up to  spectators.

Season records

Tournament results

References

External links 
 
 

Eisloewen, Dresden
Ice hockey teams in Germany